Events in the year 1950 in Spain.

Incumbents
Caudillo: Francisco Franco

Births
January 16 - Cristina Galbó, actress
January 24 – Matilde Fernández
May 27 - Antonio Corell.
June 16 - Pepe Navarro.
June 28 - Francisca Pleguezuelos.
September 14 - Antonio Culebras.
October 13 - Teresa Riera.
November 22 - José Ramón López.
December 13 - Luisa Fernanda Rudi Ubeda.
Agustín Díaz Yanes.

Deaths
Alfonso Daniel Rodríguez Castelao, Spanish politician, writer, painter and doctor (b. 1886)
Carmen Baroja, Spanish writer, ethnologist (b. 1883)
 August 31 -- Pere Tarrés i Claret, Spanish Roman Catholic priest and blessed (b. 1905)
 Francisca Herrera Garrido, Spanish writer (b. 1869)

See also
 List of Spanish films of 1950

References

 
Years of the 20th century in Spain
Spain
Spain